The Takatsuki class destroyer was a vessel of the Japan Maritime Self-Defense Force.

In 1985-1988, Takatsuki and Kikuzuki were upgraded with Sea Sparrow SAM launchers, Harpoon missile anti-ship missile launchers, Phalanx CIWS systems (Kikuzuki only), new FCS (FCS-2-12) fire control radar and TASS. Mochizuki and Nagatsuki were in the upgrade program, but were eventually not upgraded.

Ships

Books
The Maru Special, Ships of the JMSDF No.57 Takatsuki class escort vessels, Ushio Shobō (Japan), November 1981
The Maru Special, Ships of the JMSDF No.78 Electronics weapons, Power Plants and Helicopters, Ushio Shobō (Japan), August 1983

 

Destroyer classes